Kanchura (Qansıra) is a rural locality (a village) in Shabagishsky Selsoviet, Kuyurgazinsky District, Bashkortostan, Russia. The population was 185 as of 2010. There are 4 streets.

Geography 
Kanchura is located 15 km northwest of Yermolayevo (the district's administrative centre) by road. Kumertau is the nearest rural locality.

References 

Rural localities in Kuyurgazinsky District